Uzynagash (Uzynağaş) is a selo in Zhambyl District in Almaty Region of south-eastern Kazakhstan. It is the capital of the district. Population:

Location 
Uzynagash is a village in Zhambyl district. Its geographical location is 314 km from the Taldykorgan city to the south-west, 44 km from Almaty to the west.
Village in  1929-1956 years was a center  production of agricultural dairy products at Lenin Farmhouse. It is named "Uzynagash", due to the richness of the tall trees in the region visible. According to other data, here it is mentioned about the length and flow of the rivers may have left ...

Notable people
 Askhat Kadyrkulov (born 1974), former footballer
 Beibut Atamkulov (born 1964), politician
 Dadash Babazhanov (1922-1985), machine gunner in the Red Army
 Nikolai Dzhumagaliev (born 1952), serial killer and cannibal

References

Populated places in Almaty Region